BuildHive was a free cloud-hosted continuous integration service for GitHub projects, based on Jenkins.

Features 
BuildHive can detect, build and test a number of common project types, such as Apache Maven and Play, without the need for any configuration by the developer. It starts a build and test cycle every time it sees a new commit to a registered GitHub repository.

It will also automatically schedule builds for GitHub pull requests, and leave a pass/fail comment on the pull request, so that project owners can know whether pull requests pass all the tests before merging them, and contributors do not have to wait for all tests to run on their own machine before submitting a pull request.

A number of its features are provided by commercial Jenkins plugins which Cloudbees also makes available to its paying customers. BuildHive does not support private GitHub repositories or complex configurations, but the commercial Cloudbees service is available for those with such requirements.

History 
BuildHive was originally started as a Christmas side project by developer Kohsuke Kawaguchi.

See also 
 Travis CI

External links 
 BuildHive
 BuildHive public issue tracker

References 

Continuous integration
Internet properties established in 2012
Cloud applications